Young Wives' Tale is a 1949 comedy play by the British writer Ronald Jeans. It premiered at the Theatre Royal, Brighton before transferring to the Savoy Theatre in London's West End where it ran for 373 performances between 7 July 1949 and 27 May 1950. The original London cast included Naunton Wayne, Joan Greenwood, Derek Farr, Joan Haythorne and Margaret Scudamore.

Adaptation
In 1951 it was made into a British film of the same title directed by Henry Cass, with Greenwood and Farr reprising their stage roles alongside Nigel Patrick, Athene Seyler and Audrey Hepburn.

References

Bibliography
 Goble, Alan. The Complete Index to Literary Sources in Film. Walter de Gruyter, 1999.
 Wearing, J.P. The London Stage 1940-1949: A Calendar of Productions, Performers, and Personnel.  Rowman & Littlefield, 2014.

1949 plays
Comedy plays
West End plays
Plays by Ronald Jeans
British plays adapted into films
Plays set in London